Kokmuiža Manor, also called Kocēni Manor, is a manor house in the Kocēni, Kocēni Parish, Valmiera Municipality in historical region of Vidzeme, in northern Latvia.

History 
It was built before 1760 in  late Baroque style. The building currently houses the Kocēni primary school.

It was the birthplace in 1793 of the famous botanist and plant explorer, Nicolai Anders von Hartwiss.

See also
List of palaces and manor houses in Latvia

References

External links

  Kokmuiža (Kocēni) Manor

Manor houses in Latvia
Baroque architecture in Latvia
Valmiera Municipality
Vidzeme